Pengal is a 1968 Indian Malayalam-language film, directed by A. K. Sahadevan. The film stars Sathyan, T. S. Muthaiah, Kottayam Chellappan and M. S. Namboothiri. The film had musical score by K. V. Job and George.

Cast
Sathyan
T. S. Muthaiah
Kottayam Chellappan
M. S. Namboothiri
Madhumathi
S. P. Pillai

Soundtrack
The music was composed by K. V. Job and George with lyrics by T. P. Sukumaran and Santhakumar.

References

External links
 

1968 films
1960s Malayalam-language films